The Government Gazette of the Protectorate of Southern Nigeria was the government gazette for the Protectorate of Southern Nigeria. It was published at Old Calabar between 1900 and 1906.

Southern Nigeria was a British protectorate in the coastal areas of modern-day Nigeria, formed in 1900 from union of the Niger Coast Protectorate with territories chartered by the Royal Niger Company below Lokoja on the Niger River.

It was continued by the Southern Nigeria Government Gazette when Southern Nigeria became the Colony and Protectorate of Southern Nigeria in 1906.

See also
List of British colonial gazettes

References

External links
Nigeria official publications at the British Library

Publications established in 1900
Publications disestablished in 1906
Colonial Nigeria
History of Nigeria
Government gazettes of Nigeria